Springfield Union Station is a train and bus station in the Metro Center area of Springfield, Massachusetts. Constructed in 1926, Springfield Union Station is the fifth-busiest Amtrak station in the Commonwealth, and the busiest outside of Greater Boston.

A large-scale $94 million renovation project restored the former station building, and it reopened in late June 2017 as a regional intermodal transit hub. It features not only Amtrak service, but also serves as the new hub for the Pioneer Valley Transit Authority (PVTA), along with Peter Pan Bus Lines, Greyhound Lines, and the CTrail Hartford Line commuter rail. PVTA and intercity bus services began using the renovated station in 2017, and the Hartford Line opened in June 2018. Amtrak moved from a 1994-built structure to the renovated station in June 2019.

History

Springfield's grand Union Station was constructed in 1926 by the Boston & Albany Railroad to replace an earlier Richardson Romanesque unique dual-station by Shepley Rutan and Coolidge, the successor firm to that of noted American architect, H. H. Richardson (architect of Trinity Church in Copley Square, Boston). Prior to that, an Egyptian Revival structure served the city until the first so-called Union Station was built in 1851.

The 1926 station was built for $5.87 million. The station opened to the public on December 18, 1926.

The New York, New Haven & Hartford (including the Central New England Railway) and Boston & Maine railroads also utilized the station.

As early as the 1950s, the New York Central Railroad, which had operated the Boston & Albany since 1900, considered Union Station "a white elephant" and wanted to sell it. The opening of the Massachusetts Turnpike in 1958 was said to have caused a 50% decline in passenger trips to Boston. By 1962, train departures had fallen from a 1920s-30s peak of 97 per day to fewer than 15 per day. The station was sold in 1970 to David Buntzman, a real estate speculator from Larchmont, New York.

Amtrak took over intercity service in 1971. By 1973, there were no longer enough trains calling at Springfield to justify such a large station, and the main station building and baggage building were closed. A new station would have likely been needed in any event. The building had not been well-maintained in several years, and rehabilitating it was deemed too costly. After this, Amtrak opened a makeshift station at street level within the passenger tunnel, with the sole entrance being from Lyman Street. The connection from the tunnel to the old station was sealed. The city of Springfield bought the station in 1989, but planned restoration efforts were hampered by a fire at the nearby Charles Hotel.

In 1994, Amtrak constructed a station building at track level and sealed off the passenger tunnel except for the Lyman Street entrance and the southernmost stairway and elevator shaft to track level. A modern elevator was installed in the remaining open shaft to connect from street level to the new station building above.

Renovation
In October 2008, the Pioneer Valley Transit Authority and the Springfield Redevelopment Authority released a redevelopment plan for Union Station. The plan, estimated to cost $65.2 million, called for restoring the 1926 Union Station Terminal building for reuse as an intermodal rail and bus station and fully building out the first floor and main concourse with rentable commercial space and ticketing and waiting areas for both rail and bus. The baggage/railway express building was to be demolished and baggage tunnel sealed. A parking garage and bus bays for both inter-city and regional bus services (which would replace the Peter L. Picknelly Transportation Center a block away) would go on the footprint of the former baggage building. Additionally the pedestrian tunnel to Lyman Street would be restored, and the platforms raised for handicapped accessibility. The final plan announced in December 2014, at a cost $75.7 million, added restoration and building out the upper floors of the 1926 station building to usable vacant "shell space". This would include only infrastructure and utility work on those floors, with final finishing work to be done by the eventual tenants based on their needs. This space is aimed for use by office or other commercial tenants. By the time the station opened, the full cost had risen to $94 million.

Demolition of the baggage/railway express building began on December 1, 2014, and was completed in early 2015. The only remnant of the baggage facility is a tunnel under the rail viaduct that was used for freight and baggage transport between the warehouse and the trains above. The only remaining entrance to this tunnel (off limits to the public) is a set of doors along the retaining wall in the bus loading area at the location of where the tunnel formerly connected to the warehouse. By February 2016 the parking garage had been assembled and restoration work on the station terminal building had begun, with new windows and roofing installed. The restoration was nearly complete in March 2017 when officials took journalists on a tour and the grand opening occurred on June 24, 2017.

The PVTA was the first transportation operator to use the renovated station; it began operations there on June 24, 2017, leasing 18 bus berths. Peter Pan and Greyhound buses began operating out of Union Station on September 6, 2017. The companies ended a two-decade revenue sharing agreement and began operating competing services three weeks later. The CTrail Hartford Line commuter rail service began operating out of the renovated terminal in June 2018.

Amtrak relocated ticketing and the passenger waiting area to the main concourse of Union Station in June 2019, returning intercity rail to the main station building for the first time in 45 years.

The new platform designated Platform C was installed with direct stairwell and elevator access to the passenger tunnel below. The design was finalized in March 2018. The platform design process had been delayed due to insufficient space between the stairwell head house and the platform edge. The Federal Railroad Administration denied a waiver from the clearance requirement, preventing the design from being finished before the revitalization of the historic station building itself. The project was awarded to a construction contractor in May 2018 and construction began in August 2018.  The -long high-level Platform C opened on January 23, 2020, with a final cost of $10 million. Platform C retains some historic elements of the former low-level platform it replaced, including the existing overhead canopy steel structure.

Services

Amtrak
The primary passenger rail service at Springfield Union Station are the  trains connecting Springfield to the Amtrak's Northeast Corridor trains in New Haven. An additional 1–2 daily  round trips start or terminate their service at Springfield.

The station is also served by the Vermonter and  trains. The Vermonter currently uses the north-south Connecticut River Line to Connecticut and Vermont, while the Lake Shore Limited makes use of the east–west Boston Line platforms as it continues to and from Albany, New York.

In the past a single Northeast Regional round trip (usually trains 142 and 145) would travel between New Haven and Boston via the so-called "Inland Route" via Springfield and the Boston Line, as opposed to the faster, electrified Northeast Corridor. In 2003, a problem pulled the Acela Express trainsets out of service and in an effort to find substitute rolling stock, Amtrak first curtailed the inland round trip to a three-car shuttle between Boston and New Haven before canceling it completely. Today, all normally scheduled Regional trains using the Inland Route only use the portion between Springfield and New Haven; in the event of a service disruption on the Northeast Corridor, trains may be scheduled to run via the complete Inland Route. One such occasion was the replacement of the Thames River Bridge movable span in June 2008, when Amtrak scheduled three round trips per day over the Inland Route to substitute for the complete suspension of regular Northeast Corridor service.

In 1991, Amtrak extended one daily Atlantic City Express round trip to Springfield, which served other destinations such as Washington, D.C. and Harrisburg. The service was discontinued in 1995 due to low ridership.

Hartford Line
Springfield's renovated Union Station is the northern terminus for the CTrail Hartford Line, a commuter rail service which began operating out of Union Station on June 16, 2018. On July 24, 2017 the Connecticut Department of Transportation announced that a joint partnership between TransitAmerica Services and Alternate Concepts Inc. was chosen as the operator for the new service. This partnership operates similar commuter services in other markets. Amtrak continues its present intercity service on the line and will continue to own and maintain the infrastructure on the rail line between New Haven and Springfield. The expanded service to Springfield Union Station from New Haven includes a total of seven additional roundtrips, four of which are commuter trains operated by the new CTrail operator, and the other three of which are additional Amtrak Shuttles which brings the service to eight Amtrak round trips and four CTrail round trips. In September 2019, Amtrak ceased using the Shuttle brand name for the 400 series trains and adopted CTDOT's Hartford Line designation. All Amtrak and CTrail trains that terminate and originate at Springfield (or Hartford) now utilize the Hartford Line designation. On August 30, 2019, Amtrak extended two daily  round trips (branded as Valley Flyer) to Greenfield as a pilot program.

Bus operations
Union Station serves as the region's bus hub. The Pioneer Valley Transit Authority, which operates local buses serving Springfield and surrounding towns and cities, occupies 18 bus berths at the station. Springfield-based Peter Pan Bus Lines uses seven bus berths for intercity buses, and Greyhound Lines uses the remaining two for its intercity service.

Possible future rail service
The Massachusetts Department of Transportation and the Vermont Agency of Transportation have completed a study to examine the opportunities and impacts of more frequent and higher speed intercity passenger rail service between Boston and Montreal. The Boston to Montreal corridor runs from Boston to Springfield Union Station. From St. Albans, the corridor continues to the Canada–US border and onward to Montreal Central Station in Quebec. This study has been designated the Northern New England Intercity Rail Initiative. This would mark the first Boston-Montreal rail service since the Boston & Maine discontinued the Alouette in 1965, which operated via a direct route through Concord, New Hampshire. 

Springfield Union Station has been proposed as an intermediate station for East-West Rail; the proposed rail project would restore frequent passenger rail services between Boston and Pittsfield. In December 2022, MassDOT along with Amtrak and CSX applied for $108 million in federal transportation money to help fund improvements along the 53 miles of railroad between Springfield and Worcester. The track upgrades will increase speeds on the corridor up to 80 miles per hour. It is planned to add two daily Amtrak trips between Boston, Worcester and Springfield as an interim phase of inland east-west rail service. No timeline has been set for service implementation.

Station layout

The Union Station building, bus bays, and parking garage are located on the north side of the rail viaduct adjacent to Frank B. Murray Street. The stairwells and elevators to the boarding platforms is located on the south side of the viaduct next to Lyman Street. A tunnel leads under the viaduct, allowing Union Station to be accessed from Lyman Street. The main hall in Union Station includes a waiting area for rail passengers, restaurants, retail spaces, and ticket windows for rail and intercity bus services; a PVTA local bus waiting area and an intercity bus waiting area are located in an adjacent room. Commercial space is located on the second and third floors.

The rail viaduct holds six tracks, which are numbered 1, 2, 2a, 4, 6, and 8 from north to south. Tracks 1 and 2 are primarily used by CSX Transportation for freight service on their Berkshire Subdivision and are served by platforms A and B - track 2 is also used for boarding and disembarking of the daily Lake Shore Limited train. Track 2a, which connects with both the New Haven-Springfield Line and the CSX tracks, is owned by Amtrak is used mainly for storing train equipment and is not normally used for boarding. Tracks 4 through 8 (serving platforms C and D) are currently used for most Amtrak service; they connect directly to the New Haven–Springfield Line west of the station, but only connect to the CSX tracks east of the station. (The Lake Shore Limited uses the CSX tracks for this reason.) West of the station, the New Haven–Springfield Line curves to the south while the Berkshire Subdivision continues on to cross the Connecticut River on a twin truss bridge. The Connecticut River Line connects to both lines west of the station, although it requires a backup move to reach tracks 4 though 8.

The four current platforms were once all island platforms, with stairways to the under-track tunnel and cargo elevators to a separate tunnel serving the baggage/railway express building. Platform C, between tracks 4 and 6, was demolished and rebuilt as a high-level boarding platform. Platform C is served by its own elevator and stairwell from the passenger tunnel. Platform D, which serves track 8 and is adjacent to the former 1994 station building, is accessed from the older elevator and stairwell closest to the Lyman Street entrance. Platform B/track 2 is accessed via a paved walkway from the west end of platform D that crosses tracks 2A, 4, 6, and 8.

Station services
The station offers a Commuter Variety newsstand that sells quick necessities, Dunkin' Donuts and Subway restaurants.

The company will occupy the entire third floor of the building.

References

Further reading

External links 

Springfield Union Station – Springfield Redevelopment Authority

Springfield Union Station – Hartford Line
Springfield – Greyhound
Springfield – Peter Pan

Amtrak stations in Massachusetts
Stations on the New Haven–Springfield Line
Union stations in the United States
Stations along New York, New Haven and Hartford Railroad lines
Stations along Central New England Railway lines
Former Boston and Albany Railroad stations
Stations along Boston and Maine Railroad lines
Economy of Springfield, Massachusetts
Railway stations in Hampden County, Massachusetts
Railway stations in the United States opened in 1926